Delfi (occasionally capitalized as DELFI) is a  news website in Estonia, Latvia, and Lithuania providing daily news, ranging from gardening to politics. It ranks as one of the most popular websites among Baltic users.

Delfi operates in the respective Baltic countries under the domain names delfi.ee, delfi.lv, and delfi.lt. Aside from versions in the Estonian, Latvian, and Lithuanian languages, the company offers Russian language versions of its portal in all three countries. On 12 March 2012, Delfi started a Polish version under pl.delfi.lt. A year later an English version was added under en.delfi.lt.

In March 2014, delfi.ua version was closed.

In February 2016, most of the delfi.lt English-language version content were placed under a paywall to restrict access to most articles without a paid subscription, as the articles in this version of Delfi are supported by the Lithuania Tribune, which raised questions on implementing the paywall there. It is unknown if other language editions will be implementing the paywall.

Company development 
Delfi was established in 1999 by the Estonian company MicroLink and sold in 2003, to the Norwegian company Findexa. In 2007, Estonian media group Ekspress Grupp acquired 100% of Delfi stocks for €54m. It operates under a single name in the three Baltic states of Lithuania, Estonia, and Latvia, and also in Ukraine. It has its own bureau in Moscow, Kaliningrad, Warsaw, and Stockholm. It also sources its news reports from the Baltic News Service and from wire services.

Freedom of speech 
Because visitors of Delfi can anonymously comment on every news story, this site generates debates over freedom of speech in the Baltic States. Some members of the Estonian and Lithuanian Parliaments have proposed laws making Delfi and other news portals responsible for the contents of anonymous comments. In September 2006, attorneys of Artūras Zuokas, the mayor for Vilnius, asked public prosecutors to seize Delfi servers and reveal the IP addresses of all anonymous commentators that have written comments about him in several Delfi publications.

In June 2015, the European Court of Human Rights ruled in Delfi AS v. Estonia that holding delfi.ee responsible for its readers' comments did not violate the European Convention on Human Rights' protection of freedom of speech.

Patron of the University of Latvia 
Since 2018, Delfi has been a bronze patron of the University of Latvia Foundation. Support is granted to students of Communication science of the Faculty of Social Sciences of the University of Latvia, as well as other students of Communication and Journalism in all Latvian higher education institutions. In 2018, the first scholarships in the amount of 10,000 EUR was awarded. Delfi is an internet partner and supporter of the social scholarship "Ceļamaize 2009".

References

Sources
 Internet portals in the Baltic States: legal issues by Liutauras Ulevičius

External links
 The Delfi web portal for Estonia
 The Delfi web portal for Latvia
 The Delfi web portal for Lithuania

Mass media companies of Lithuania
Latvian news websites
Lithuanian news websites
1999 establishments in Lithuania
Estonian news websites
Russian-language websites